Diophila claricoma is a moth in the family Autostichidae. It is found in Uganda.

The wingspan is about 12 mm. The forewings are fuscous irregularly irrorated dark fuscous and with a narrow blackish basal patch, angularly produced on the dorsum, and on the costa with a streak nearly to the middle. There is a triangular blotch of dark fuscous irroration on costa about the middle, its anterior edge rather raised, and a blackish dorsal spot opposite its apex. A smaller blotch of dark fuscous irroration is found on the costa at three-fourths. The hindwings are rather dark grey.

References

Natural History Museum Lepidoptera generic names catalog

Autostichinae
Moths described in 1937